Sunanda Nair, better known by her stage name Karthika is an Indian actress who worked predominantly in Malayalam movies and a few Tamil movies. She was one of the popular lead Malayalam actresses during 1984-1988. She is well known for her portrayal of Charumathy in Nayakan.

Early life
Karthika was born on Thiruvananthapuram, Kerala to Captain PKR Nair, a retired army officer, Ex Servicemen Corporation Chairman and leader of Ex-Service Congress affiliated to the Congress party. Her mother is a homemaker. She has a sister, Sujatha Balgovind. She is a trained classical dancer and Kathakali artist. She is also an amateur Tennis player.

Film career
Karthika made her cinema debut as a junior artist. Her first film was in 1984, Oru Painkilikatha directed by Balachandra Menon. She played one of the group dancers in the movie. However, she got a heroine role in the very next year. Her second film is Manicheppu Thurannappol. In the movie, she played one among the female leads along with Jalaja.

She has worked in twenty films, among which two films are Tamil films and the rest are Malayalam films. Adiverukal, Thalavattam, Sanmanassullavarkku Samadhanam, Neela Kurinji Poothappol, Ente Entethu Mathram, Desatanakkili Karayarilla, Kariyilakkattu Pole and Adukkan Entheluppam are the films performed by her in 1986. In 1987, she worked in films like Idanazhiyil Oru Kaalocha, Gandhinagar 2nd Street, Unnikale Oru Kadha Parayam, Neeyethra Dhanya, January Oru Orma and Ivide Ellavarkkum Sukham. David David Mr. David and Avanikunnile Kinnari Pookkal are the films performed by her in 1988 and 1989 respectively.

She made her Tamil debut in 1987 through Nayagan with Kamal Haasan, Saranya Ponvannan and Nizhalgal Ravi. The film directed by Mani Ratnam. Her second cum final Tamil film was with Sathyaraj in Poovizhi Vasalile directed by Fazil.
 
At the peak of her career, Karthika decided to quit the film industry. She married Dr Sunil Kumar and settled in Maldives. The couple has a son, Vishnu.

Filmography

Personal life
Karthika married Sunil Kumar in 1988. She has a son, Vishnu Sunil Jaikumar, a Veterinary Surgeon & Radiologist.

References

External links

Actresses in Malayalam cinema
20th-century Indian actresses
Year of birth missing (living people)
Living people
Actresses in Tamil cinema
Child actresses in Malayalam cinema